The Rotary Cell Culture System  (RCCS) is a device designed to grow three-dimensional cell clusters in microgravity. In the early 1990s, NASA researchers began developing hardware that would let them study the cell tissues of mammals—including humans—in microgravity. They also needed it to protect the fragile cultures from the turbulence of Space Shuttle launch and landing. The resulting device enables the growth of tissue, cancer tumors and virus cultures outside the body, both in space and on Earth.

The cell culture bioreactor—known commercially as the Rotary Cell Culture System (RCCS) -- boasts several advantages that exceed typical laboratory methods. Lab-grown cell cultures tend to be small, flat and two-dimensional, unlike normal cultures. But tissues grown in the RCCS are larger and three-dimensional, with structural and chemical characteristics similar to normal tissue. Additionally, the RCCS has no internal moving parts, therefore minimizing any forces that might damage the delicate cell cultures.

Uses
Using RCCS technology, researchers could potentially test chemotherapy agents on a patient's own cancer cells outside the patient's body. There are similar possibilities for AIDS research: the RCCS can produce human HIV host cells that can be infected and studied.

Today, leading research facilities across the United States are employing the RCCS to study cancer, cystic fibrosis and infectious diseases such as the avian flu, Ebola virus and monkey pox. They're also using the RCCS to provide tissues for the development of HIV vaccines and other drugs.

A closed tubular cylinder forms the system's cell culture chamber, which is filled with a liquid medium in which cells grow on micrometre-size beads. The chamber rotates around a horizontal axis, allowing the cells to develop in an environment similar to the free-fall of microgravity. Oxygen, required by cells for growth, is fed into the liquid medium through a porous wall in the chamber.

The NASA researchers who led the development of the cell culture bioreactor were named co-recipients of the 1991 NASA Inventor of the Year Award because of their work on the project.

References
Fighting Diseases: NASA Takes it Outside
SPINOFF 2002 - Johnson Space Center

NASA spin-off technologies
Cell culture